
Gmina Kroczyce is a rural gmina (administrative district) in Zawiercie County, Silesian Voivodeship, in southern Poland.

Villages
Gmina Kroczyce contains the villages and settlements of Biała Błotna, Browarek, Dobrogoszczyce, Dzibice, Gołuchowice, Huta Szklana, Kostkowice, Kroczyce Okupne, Kroczyce Stare, Lgota Murowana, Lgotka, Piaseczno, Podlesice, Pradła, Przyłubsko, Siamoszyce, Siedliszowice, Siemięrzyce, Szypowice and Trzciniec.

Neighbouring gminas
Gmina Kroczyce is bordered by the town of Zawiercie and by the gminas of Irządze, Niegowa, Ogrodzieniec, Pilica, Szczekociny and Włodowice.

External links

Kroczyce
Zawiercie County